The Conan Gray World Tour 2022 was the third concert tour by American singer-songwriter Conan Gray. The tour began on March 1, 2022 in Dallas, and concluded on June 9, 2022 in London. It consisted of 54 shows across North America and Europe. Opening acts included Bülow in North America and Mallrat in Europe. Benee opened for the show in Berlin. Shortly after concluding this tour, Gray announced his fourth concert tour, The Superache Tour in fall 2022 in support of his second studio album, Superache.

Background 
In early 2020, Gray announced a tour in support of his debut album, Kid Krow, set to begin in April of that year. After releasing his album the next month, Gray cancelled this tour due to the COVID-19 pandemic. On October 25, 2021 Gray announced he would tour again in the spring of 2022. Gray announced his second studio album, Superache in the midst of his tour, as the upcoming album would come out after the tour concluded.

Set list 
 "Wish You Were Sober"
 "Telepath"
 "Comfort Crowd"
 "Fight or Flight"
 "(Online Love)"
 "Astronomy"
 "The Cut That Always Bleeds"
 "Checkmate"
 "Overdrive"
 "Affluenza"
 "The Story"
 "Lookalike"
 "Little League"
 "Jigsaw"
 "People Watching"
 "Maniac"

Encore 
17. "Heather"

Notes 
 Starting with the show in Phoenix, "Memories" was added to the set list
 Starting with the show in Barcelona, "Lookalike" was removed from the set list and was replaced with 'Yours"

Shows 
List of tour dates, showing date, city, country, venue and opening acts.

References 

2022 concert tours
Conan Gray concert tours
Concert tours of North America
Concert tours of Europe
Concert tours of the United States
Concert tours of Canada
Concert tours of Norway
Concert tours of Sweden
Concert tours of Denmark
Concert tours of Germany
Concert tours of Austria
Concert tours of Switzerland
Concert tours of Italy
Concert tours of Spain
Concert tours of France
Concert tours of Belgium
Concert tours of the Netherlands
Concert tours of Ireland
Concert tours of the United Kingdom